Stephen Joseph Murphy III (born September 23, 1962) is a United States district judge of the United States District Court for the Eastern District of Michigan.

Education

Murphy was born in St. Louis, Missouri. He received a Bachelor of Science degree in economics with a minor in English from Marquette University in 1984 and a Juris Doctor from Saint Louis University School of Law in 1987. During his time at Saint Louis University School of Law, Murphy edited the law review, served on the Moot Court Board, and won the White Family Fellowship in Public Law. He graduated from St. Louis University High School in 1980.

Legal career

Following law school, Murphy served as a trial attorney for the United States Department of Justice from 1987 to 1992, hired under the Attorney General's Honors Program. Murphy worked in the Civil and Tax Divisions in Washington, D.C. where he defended various federal agencies and prosecuted criminal tax cases in federal district courts throughout the United States. Next, Murphy worked as an Assistant United States Attorney in Detroit from 1992 to 2000 where he prosecuted and tried various violent crimes, narcotics offenses, and several high-profile white-collar criminal cases in Detroit's federal court. Following his time as Assistant United States Attorney, Murphy was an attorney with the General Motors Legal Staff in Detroit from 2000 to 2005, where he specialized in litigation, internal investigations, counseling on various business law issues, and other "white collar" matters. He served during that period as a public arbitrator for the National Association of Securities Dealers.
On March 9, 2005, Murphy began serving as the United States Attorney in Detroit, Michigan, pending full Senate confirmation. He was unanimously confirmed by the Senate on June 8, 2005. He was preceded by Jeffery Collins. During his term, Murphy worked to create innovative programs regarding national security and child protection issues. He also strove to strengthen the US Attorney's ties with federal and local law enforcement and with the community at large. Overseeing operations in Detroit, Flint, and Bay City, Murphy led one of the largest and busiest US Attorney's offices in the country.  During this time, Murphy also chaired the local U.S. Attorney General's Anti-Terrorism Advisory Committee and the Michigan High Intensity Drug Trafficking Area ("HIDTA") group.

Federal judicial service

On June 28, 2006, President George W. Bush nominated Murphy and Raymond Kethledge to fill two vacancies on the United States Court of Appeals for the Sixth Circuit. Murphy was to occupy a seat made vacant by the death of Judge Susan Bieke Neilson. At the time of the nomination, Republicans maintained a majority of seats in the Senate. However, following the 2006 midterm election, nominations stalled. In an attempt to end the partisan gridlock, on April 15, 2008, President Bush renominated Kethledge and failed Clinton nominee Helene White to the Sixth Circuit, and Murphy was nominated to the U.S. District Court for the Eastern District of Michigan to replace Judge Patrick J. Duggan, a vacancy that had remained unfilled since 2000.

Murphy, Kethledge, and White received a joint hearing before the Senate Judiciary Committee on May 7, 2008 and were confirmed on June 24, 2008. Murphy’s nomination was confirmed by unanimous consent on that day. Regarding his confirmation, Murphy told the Detroit Free Press, "It's a huge thrill and an enormous honor." He received his judicial commission on August 18, 2008. 

During his tenure on the bench, Murphy has served on the boards of the Hospice of Michigan and Brighton Hospital. He was appointed by the Eastern District of Michigan to serve as a member of the Standing Committee on United States Courts for the State Bar of Michigan and is currently a member of the Advisory Committee on Appellate Rules of Judicial Conference of the United States.

Notable rulings 
United States Student Association Foundation; ACLU, et al., v. Terri Lynn Land, Michigan Secretary of State; Christopher M. Thomas, Michigan Director of Elections; and Frances McMullan, City Clerk for the City of Ypsilanti, Michigan, in their official capacities, 585 F. Supp. 2d 925 (E.D. Mich. 2008)Multiple civil rights organizations sought preliminary injunction against Michigan Secretary of State and Director of Elections to prohibit the rejection of a voter's registration when a voter's ID card was returned to election officials as undeliverable and when the voter applied for an out of state driver's license. The Court found that irreparable harm was likely in regards to the undeliverable voter identification practice, but not as likely in regards to the driver's license practice. Judge Murphy granted in part and denied in part the summary judgment.Lorraine Havard, as Guardian of Chelsie Barker, a minor, v. Deputy Puntuer, Deputy Griffin, C. Frazier, R.N., 600 F. Supp. 2d 845 (E.D. Mich. 2009)

Chelsie Barker was born in a county jail where her mother was incarcerated. Chelsie suffered injuries during and immediately after her birth that led to severe retardation and cerebral palsy due to the negligence of jail employees. Wayne County sought to dismiss the case against them, however the motion was denied by Judge Murphy because Barker stated a valid civil rights claim under the Fourteenth Amendment. The Sixth Circuit upheld Judge Murphy's decision in Havard v. Wayne County, 436 F. App'x 451 (6th Cir. 2011).Ryan C. Henry, et al., v. Quicken Loans Inc., et al., No. 2:04-cv-40346, 2009 WL 3199788 (E.D. Mich. Sept. 30, 2009)Four hundred and fifteen "Mortgage Bankers" for Quicken Loans filed an Overtime Collective Action Suit according to the Fair Labor Standards Act ("FLSA"). These mortgage bankers often worked more than forty hours per week and were not paid overtime for those excess hours. Quicken Loans claimed that mortgage bankers were not entitled to overtime compensation because of the nature of the job, which fell under "administrative exemption" of FLSA. The Court accepted and adopted the report and recommendation of the Magistrate Judge to grant summary judgment and partial summary judgment to both plaintiffs and defendants.Acts 17 Apologetics v. City of Dearborn, 2012 WL 12961117 (E.D. Mich. 2012)While attending an Arab International Festival to engage Muslims in dialogue, Acts 17 Apologetics members were arrested after a festival worker claimed that the member threatened his safety. The Acts 17 members were acquitted of the charges by a jury. Subsequently, the members, including apologist Nabeel Qureshi, filed action against the city, ten city employees, and two Arab American Chamber of Commerce officials with a twelve-count complaint alleging violations of defamation, assault, battery, and intentional infliction of emotional distress. The defendants motioned for partial judgment, which the Court denied.United States of America v. Carlos Powell, et al., 943 F. Supp. 2d 759 (E.D. Mich. 2013).Defendant Powell was charged with drug dealing, firearms, and money laundering offenses in connection with a large scale drug trafficking ring. He brought a motion to suppress any evidence that was seized during the warrantless searches of his vehicles, searches of nine properties pursuant to warrants, and evidence that was obtained by electronic interception of cell phone location data. Judge Murphy denied his motion to suppress on the basis of the good faith exception. Murphy's ruling was upheld by the Sixth Circuit in United States v. Powell, 847 F.3d 760 (6th Cir. 2017).United States of America v. Steven Dwight Hammond and Dwight Lincoln Hammond, Jr., 742 F.3d 880 (9th Cir. 2014)Steven and Dwight Hammond were convicted by a jury of maliciously damaging the real property of the United States by fire by the District Court. They were given sentences lower than the statutory minimum. Sitting by designation on the Ninth Circuit Court of Appeals, Judge Murphy authored the opinion of a unanimous panel, finding that the district court erred by sentencing the defendants for terms less than the statutory minimum. Their sentences were vacated and the case was remanded for resentencing in compliance with the law. 

Upon hearing of the case, ranchers Ammon and Ryan Bundy planned a protest of Steven and Dwight Hammond's resentencing. While the Hammonds rejected the Bundys' assistance, brothers Ammon and Ryan continued with their protest, leading to a 40-day armed occupation beginning January 2, 2016 at the headquarters of Malheur National Wildlife Refuge. 

International Brotherhood of Teamsters, Airline Division, v. Allegiant Air, LLC; Allegiant Travel Company, 788 F.3d 1080 (9th Cir. 2015)

In 2012, Allegiant Air pilots joined the Teamster's Union and notified Allegiant of their intent to negotiate a new collective bargaining agreement. After Allegiant made changes to the existing Pilot Work Rules, Teamsters brought suit to prohibit Allegiant from making the proposed rule changes while the union negotiated a  new collective bargaining agreement. They argued that the Allegiant Air Pilots Advocacy Group ("AAPAG"), who had negotiated the previous work rules was a representative under the Railway Labor Act ("RLA"). The district court issued the injunction and the airline appealed. Judge Murphy, writing for the Ninth Circuit, vacated the injunction, finding that AAPAG was not an RLA representative. The case was remanded in order for Allegiant and the Teamsters to continue negotiating a bargaining agreement.

City of Oakland v. Loretta E. Lynch, Attorney General of the United States; Melinda Haag, United States Attorney for the Northern District of California, 798 F.3d 1159 (9th Cir. 2015)

The City of Oakland is home to four permitted marijuana dispensaries. In this case, the city sought declaratory judgment stating that the government did not have the authority to seek civil forfeiture of the property of a marijuana store according to the Controlled Substances Act and injunctive relief to prohibit the government from seeking forfeiture of the property. In an opinion written by Judge Murphy, the Ninth Circuit Court of Appeals affirmed the district court's decision and held that Oakland's claims were barred by the APA because filing forfeiture only meant that the government was intending to challenge the status quo -- rights, obligations, and legal consequences would later be determined by a judge.

Gary B., et al., v. Richard Snyder, et al., Case No. 2:16-cv-13292 (E.D. Mich. 2018)

The Plaintiffs, students of Detroit Public Schools, claimed that the poor quality of their education was a violation of the Due Process and Equal Protection Clauses of the Fourteenth Amendment, citing that their lack of access to literacy could be attributed to racial prejudice. The Defendants, including former Michigan governor Rick Snyder and other state officials, filed a motion to dismiss the complaint, as they believed they were not the responsible parties in the case, as well as stating that literacy is not in the Constitution. Murphy granted a motion to dismiss this case against the state government for the inadequacy of the public school system of Detroit, ruling that "access to literacy" and to a "minimally adequate education" is not a fundamental right.

Personal life
Murphy and his wife, Amy, have been married since 1996 and have two children.

References

External links

White House nomination
Thomas, Ken, "Bush nominates Michigan appellate judge to 6th Circuit slot," The Associated Press, April 15, 2008.
Egan, Paul, and Trowbridge, Gordon, "U.S. Attorney in Detroit nominated to federal bench," The Detroit News, April 15, 2008.

1962 births
Living people
Assistant United States Attorneys
Judges of the United States District Court for the Eastern District of Michigan
Marquette University alumni
Lawyers from St. Louis
Saint Louis University School of Law alumni
United States Attorneys for the Eastern District of Michigan
United States Department of Justice lawyers
United States district court judges appointed by George W. Bush
21st-century American judges